The One of the Best was a British automobile built in 1905.  A 9 hp light car, it was the product of a jack manufacturer named Adams from Tunbridge Wells who had previously made petrol engine conversions for horse-drawn vehicles.

See also
 List of car manufacturers of the United Kingdom

Veteran vehicles
Defunct motor vehicle manufacturers of England